Maisonnette is an unincorporated community in Gloucester County, New Brunswick, Canada. It held village status prior to 2023.

The fishing village is located on the north shore of Caraquet Harbour near Pointe de Maisonnette, opposite the town of Caraquet on the Acadian Peninsula.

History

The village was first settled in 1832 as a temporary fishing port for people from Caraquet and Bertrand. Their small cabins (maisonnettes in French) was the inspiration for the name of the village.

Maisonnette is French for "little house". Formerly Ste. Jeanne D'Arc, the name was changed on October 1, 1936.

On 1 January 2023, Maisonnette amalgamated with three other villages and all or part of four local service districts to form the new town of Rivière-du-Nord. The community's name remains in official use.

Demographics 

Notable people

See also
List of communities in New Brunswick

References

External links
 Bienvenue a Maisonnette (French)

Communities in Gloucester County, New Brunswick
Former villages in New Brunswick